Hamireh (also Romanized as Ḩamīreh, Hamīreh, and Ḩomeyreh; also known as Ḩameyr and Humāirāh) is a village in Gheyzaniyeh Rural District, in the Central District of Ahvaz County, Khuzestan Province, Iran. At the 2006 census, its population was 194, in 20 families.

References 

Populated places in Ahvaz County